The Bishop's Bedroom is an Italian thriller-drama film directed by Dino Risi adapted from the novel of the same name by Piero Chiara. It stars Ugo Tognazzi, Ornella Muti and Patrick Dewaere. Supporting actors include Lia Tanzi and Piero Mazzarella.

Lake Maggiore provides a beautiful and evocative backdrop to the action: the central events of the film take place around Baveno as opposed to Oggebbio in the novel.

Plot 
The movie is set in the immediate aftermath of World War II, in the lakeside region of northern Italy, close to the Swiss border; during the last phase of the conflict many affluent inhabitants of Milan evacuated the city to avoid the aerial bombings and the ravages of war, taking residence in the placid lake countryside.

Marco Maffei (Patrick Dewaere), a young man who fled to Switzerland to avoid being drafted, returns to the Italian shores at the helm of a small boat named "Tinca". Well-off albeit not exactly rich, he knows sooner or later he'll have to find a stable job, but still can't resolve to abandon the idle life he has led so far.

Marco meets an odd, quirky man named Temistocle Mario Orimbelli (Ugo Tognazzi), a womanizing liar who has led a colorful life, being involved in the Italian-Abyssinian War of 1935-36, and later following the advancing Allied armies from Napoli to Milan, finally settling as the husband of Cleofe Berlusconi, an aging, rich woman, who resents his laziness and his weakness of character.

Orimbelli invites Marco to dinner where he meets his wife and his sister-in-law, Matilde (Ornella Muti) with whom the young man becomes instantly smitten before spending the night in the "Bishop's Room" (where a relative of Cleofe, rumored to be a homosexual clergyman, used to spend his summer vacations before being found drowned in a bay of the nearby lake).

A sort of "camaraderie", if not outright friendship, flourishes between Marco and Orimbelli, despite the age difference, and they spend some time with two uninhibited Swiss girls, cruising along the lake on the "Tinca". Later Orimbelli confesses to Marco to have a relationship with Matilde, and that only his lack of means prevents him from fleeing with her. The young man, who was planning to court Matilde, is shaken by the revelation but still chooses to help his "friend" taking him and Matilde on another boat trip during which he leaves them free to pursue and consummate their attraction away from the presence of Cleofe.

During one of these nights, Cleofe Berlusconi is found drowned in the same bay where her ancestor the Bishop died, and Marco begins to suspect that Orimbelli could have traveled back to his villa to kill his wife and then return to the hotel where he was staying, being given an alibi by Matilde, but doesn't say anything during the police investigation, which explains away the death of the woman as a probable case of suicide.

Orimbelli and Matilde soon get married, but their life turns out to be very different from the idyll the man was expecting, Matilde turns sour towards her newlywed husband, and any semblance of harmony between them is shattered when Cleofe's brother, Angelo Berlusconi (who was thought MIA during the Abyssinian War) suddenly reappears at the villa, revealing his capture and torture by Abyssinian warriors ten years before and his decision not to return to Italy due to the nature of the injuries he received (apparently castration or eviration).
Angelo reveals to have been in epistolary contact with his sister Cleofe during the whole time and the tone of the last letters they exchanged rules out completely any chance of suicide on her part.

At that point, Marco, urged by Matilde, insinuates to the local magistrate the possibility that Orimbelli could have killed his wife: a new and more accurate investigation reveals that Orimbelli rented a bicycle to reach Villa Berlusconi from the village where the "Tinca" was moored and Matilde is spared consequences by feigning not to know what Orimbelli intended to do during his absence. Dejected and embittered, Orimbelli asks for a few minutes alone before being arrested and led to jail, taking advantage of them to hang himself in the "Bishop's Bedroom".

After Orimbelli's death, Angelo Berlusconi forfeits his part of the inheritance to Matilde, returning to Ethiopia and leaving her in possession of the full fortune of the Berlusconi family, she hopes Marco will remain with her and become her new husband, but, after a night of passionate yet sad lovemaking, the young man leaves her, not being able to trust the girl anymore after having seen how she evidently played Orimbelli against Cleofe while biding her time to betray him in turn.

Cast
Ugo Tognazzi: Temistocle Mario Orimbelli
Ornella Muti: Matilde Scrosati in Berlusconi
Patrick Dewaere: Marco Maffei
Lia Tanzi: Landina
Gabriella Giacobbe: Cleofe Berlusconi In Orimbelli
Max Turilli: Angelo Berlusconi
Piero Mazzarella: Brighenti
Renzo Ozzano: Brigadiere
Katia Tchenko: Charlotte

Locations and curiosity
In order to interpret the role of Matilde, the actress Lilli Carati was initially chosen.

In the film and in the novel there are two boats: the Tinca and the Lady.
The Tinca was originally called Jamaica and was an lifeboat of the Angelina Lauro. Now the boat has sunk and is located under the port of Ranco (Varese). Coordinates: 50 meters to the south, 30 meters to the coast, 10 meters below the level of the water line.
The Lady was a sloop of 1898.

For the main location where is located the room that gives the title to the film (and the novel), Villa Cleofe, has been used Villa Castelli, historic home currently in a state of neglect located in Via Torino Passeggiata Lungolago in Stresa (Verbania).
                                                        (Info by the Dizionario del Turismo Cinematografico)

See also 
List of Italian films of 1977

Notes

External links 
 

1977 films
1977 comedy-drama films
1970s Italian-language films
Films directed by Dino Risi
Films scored by Armando Trovajoli
Commedia all'italiana
Titanus films
Films set in Italy
Films based on Italian novels
1970s Italian films